The Orinoco is one of the longest rivers in South America at . It is the fourth largest river in the world by discharge volume of water. The Orinoco River and its tributaries are the major transportation system for eastern and interior Venezuela and the Llanos of Colombia. The environment and wildlife in the Orinoco's basin are extremely diverse.

Etymology 
The river's name is derived from the Warao term for "a place to paddle", itself derived from the terms güiri (paddle) and noko (place) i.e. a navigable place.

History 

The mouth of the Orinoco River at the Atlantic Ocean was documented by Christopher Columbus on 1 August 1498, during his third voyage. Its source at the Cerro Delgado–Chalbaud, in the Parima range, was not explored until 453 years later, in 1951.

The Orinoco, as well as its tributaries in the eastern llanos such as the Apure and Meta, were explored in the 16th century by German expeditions under Ambrosius Ehinger and his successors. In 1531, starting at the principal outlet in the delta, the Boca de Navios, Diego de Ordaz sailed up the river to the Meta. Antonio de Berrio sailed down the Casanare to the Meta, and then down the Orinoco River and back to Coro. In 1595, after capturing de Berrio to obtain information while conducting an expedition to find the fabled city of El Dorado, the Englishman Sir Walter Raleigh sailed down the river, reaching the savanna country.

Alexander von Humboldt explored the basin in 1800, reporting on the pink river dolphins. He published extensively on the river's flora and fauna.

The sources of the Orinoco River, located at Cerro Carlos Delgado Chalbaud (2º19’05” N,  63º21’42” W), were discovered in 1951 by the French-Venezuelan expedition that went back and explored the Upper Orinoco course to the Sierra Parima near the border with Brasil, headed by Venezuelan army officer Frank Risquez Iribarren. 

The first bridge across the Orinoco River, the Angostura Bridge at Ciudad Bolívar, Venezuela, was completed in 1967. 

In 1968, an expedition was set off by National Geographic and Hovercraft from Manaus (Brazil) to Port of Spain (Trinidad). Aboard of a SR.N6 hoverwork the expedicionaries followed the Negro river upstream to where it is joined by the  Casiquiare canal in the border between Colombia and Venezuela. After following the Casiquiare to the Orinoco River they hovered thru perilous Rapids of Maipures and Atures. The Orinoco was then traversed down to its mouths in the Gulf of Paria and then to Port of Spain. The primary purpose of the expedition was filming for the BBC series The World About Us episode "The Last Great Journey on Earth from Amazon to Orinoco by Hovercraft", which aired in 1970, and demonstrated the abilities of a hovercraft, thereby promoting sales of this British invention.

In 1992, an overhead power line crossing for two 400kV-circuits was completed just west of Morocure (between the cities of Ciudad Bolívar and Ciudad Guayana), north of the confluence of Routes1 and 19.

In 2006, a second bridge, known as the Orinoquia Bridge, was completed near Ciudad Guayana, Venezuela.

Geography 

The course of the Orinoco forms a wide ellipsoidal arc, surrounding the Guiana Shield; it is divided in four stretches of unequal length that very roughly correspond to the longitudinal zonation of a typical large river: 

At its mouth, the Orinoco River forms a wide delta that branches off into hundreds of rivers and waterways that flow through  of swampy forests.

Most of the important Venezuelan rivers are tributaries of the Orinoco River, the largest being the Caroní, which joins it at Puerto Ordaz, close to the Llovizna Falls. A peculiarity of the Orinoco river system is the Casiquiare canal, which starts as an arm of the Orinoco, and finds its way to the Rio Negro, a tributary of the Amazon, thus forming a 'natural canal' between Orinoco and Amazon.

The stream gradient of the entire river is 0.05% (1,047 m over 2,250 km). Downstream of Raudales de Guaharibos the gradient is 0.01% (183/1,964), which is also the gradient from Ciudad Bolivar to the ocean (54/435).

Major rivers in the Orinoco Basin 
 Apure: from Venezuela through the east into the Orinoco
 Arauca: from Colombia to Venezuela east into the Orinoco
 Atabapo: from the Guiana Highlands of Venezuela north into the Orinoco
 Caroní: from the Guiana Highlands of Venezuela north into the Orinoco
 Casiquiare canal: in SE Venezuela, a distributary from the Orinoco flowing west to the Negro River, a major affluent to the Amazon
 Caura: from eastern Venezuela (Guiana Highlands) north into the Orinoco
 Guaviare: from Colombia east into the Orinoco
 Inírida: from Colombia southeast into the Guaviare.
 Meta: from Colombia, border with Venezuela east into the Orinoco
 Ventuari: from eastern Venezuela (the Guiana Highlands) southwest into the Orinoco
 Vichada: from Colombia east into the Orinoco

Ecology 
The boto and the giant otter inhabit the Orinoco River system. The Orinoco crocodile is one of the rarest reptiles in the world.  Its range in the wild is restricted to the middle and lower Orinoco River Basin.

More than 1000 fish species have been recorded in the river basin and about 15% are endemic. Among the fish in the river are species found in brackish or salt water in the Orinoco estuary, but also many restricted to fresh water. By far the largest orders are Characiformes and Siluriformes, which together account for more than 80% of the fresh water species. Some of the more famous are the black spot piranha and the cardinal tetra. The latter species, which is important in the aquarium industry, is also found in the Rio Negro, revealing the connection between this river and the Orinoco through the Casiquiare canal. Because the Casiquiare includes both blackwater and clear- to whitewater sections, only relatively adaptable species are able to pass through it between the two river systems.

Economic activity 
River steamers carry cargo as far as Puerto Ayacucho and the Atures Rapids.

El Florero iron mine 
In 1926, a Venezuelan mining inspector found one of the richest iron ore deposits near the Orinoco delta, south of the city of San Felix on a mountain named El Florero.  Full-scale mining of the ore deposits began after World War II, by a conglomerate of Venezuelan firms and US steel companies.  At the start in the early 1950s, about 10,000 tons of ore-bearing soil was mined per day.

Tar sands 
The Orinoco River deposits also contain extensive tar sands in the Orinoco oil belt, which may be a source of future oil production.

Eastern Venezuelan basin 

Encompassing the states of Anzoategui-Guarico and Monagas states, the Interior Range forms the northern boundary and the Guayana Shield the southern boundary.  Maturin forms the eastern subbasin and Guarico forms the western subbasin.  The El Furrial oil field was discovered in 1978, producing from late Oligocene shallow marine sandstones in an overthrusted foreland basin.

Recreation and sports 

Since 1973, the Civil Association Nuestros Rios son Navegables organize the Internacional Rally Nuestros Rios son Navegables, a motonautical round trip of over 1,200 kilometers through the Orinoco, Meta and Apure Rivers. Starting out from Ciudad Bolívar or San Fernando de Apure, is the longest fluvial rally in the world with the participation of worldwide competitors, more than 30 support boats, logistics teams, thousands of tourists and fans travel. The boats had an average speed of 120 miles per hour. 

Since 1988, the local government of Ciudad Guayana has conducted a swim race in the rivers Orinoco and Caroní, with up to 1,000 competitors. Since 1991, the Paso a Nado Internacional de los Rios Orinoco–Caroní has been celebrated every year, on a Sunday close to 19 April. Worldwide, this swim-meet has grown in importance, and it has a large number of competitors.  The 26th meet was held in 2016.

See also 
 Adaheli, the Sun in the mythology of the Orinoco region
 Fishes of the Orinoco in the Wild (2020) book
 Orinoco Flow – the song uses the Orinoco and its environs as a theme for its lyrics

Notes

References 
 Stark, James H. 1897. Stark's Guide-Book and History of Trinidad including Tobago, Granada, and St. Vincent; also a trip up the Orinoco and a description of the great Venezuelan Pitch Lake. Boston, James H. Stark, publisher; London, Sampson Low, Marston & Company. (This book has an excellent description of a trip up the Orinoco as far as Ciudad Bolívar and a detailed description of the Venezuelan Pitch Lake situated on the western side of the Gulf of Paria opposite.)
 MacKee, E.D., Nordin, C.F. and D. Perez-Hernandez (1998). "The Waters and Sediments of the Rio Orinoco and its major Tributaries, Venezuela and Colombia." United States Geological Survey water-supply paper,  /A-B. Washington: United States Government Printing Office.
 Weibezahn, F.H., Haymara, A. and M.W. Lewis (1990). The Orinoco River as an ecosystem. Caracas: Universidad Simon Bolivar.
 Rawlins, C.B. (1999). The Orinoco River. New York: Franklin Watts.
 http://www.gutenberg.org/files/50506/50506-h/50506-h.htm

External links 

 (Transcription of book from 1902)
 "Rios de Integracion ". Geurgescu, Paul. CAF. 2017

Rivers of Colombia
Rivers of Venezuela
Border rivers
Colombia–Venezuela border
International rivers of South America
Orinoco basin
Dredged rivers and waterways